Bastiments is a mountain peak at the easternmost side of the Pyrenees mountain range.

See also
Vall de Núria
Mountains of Catalonia

References

Mountains of the Pyrenees
Mountains of Pyrénées-Orientales
Mountains of Catalonia
International mountains of Europe
France–Spain border
Two-thousanders of France
Emblematic summits of Catalonia